Pierre Nlend Womé (born 26 March 1979) is a Cameroonian former professional footballer who played as a defender. A journeyman, Womé was a versatile and skillful left wingback who played for 14 clubs in six countries. At international level, he made 68 FIFA-official appearances scoring 1 goal for the Cameroon national team.

Club career
After spending his youth career at Fogape Yaoundé and the relatively eminent regional side Canon Yaoundé, Womé moved to Italy from Cameroon in the summer of 1996 to start his professional career. He began his senior career at Vicenza Calcio and spent almost seven years playing in Italy until moving to English Premier League side Fulham FC in August 2002. He was sold to Bologna F.C. 1909 in a co-ownership deal for 6 billion lire in 1999, until Roma acquired him for 2 billion lire in the same summer that Francesco Antonioli, Amedeo Mangone and Alessandro Rinaldi joined Roma for 10 billion lire, 13 billion lire and 6 billion lire respectively. In June 2000 Bologna acquired Womé outright for a fee of 1 million lire. During his time in England at Fulham, Womé scored once in the league, in a 3–0 win over West Brom in February 2003.

After playing for some notable clubs, including RCD Espanyol, Inter Milan and Werder Bremen, Womé joined 1. FC Köln in the summer of 2008 and left the team on 30 June 2010.

In late February 2012, it was announced that Womé would join Coton Sport FC de Garoua in his homeland.

From 2012 to 2014, Womé played for Canon Yaoundé, also of the Elite One.

In January 2014, he moved to Canon Yaoundé's league rivals UMS de Loum. After not having made an appearance under two coaches, he decided to leave the city and return to Yaoundé. The club's president, Pierre Kwemo, threatened to take Womé to court for "fraud and breach of trust". In March, two months after joining the club, he agreed the termination of his contract.

In March 2014, shortly after his release by UMS de Loum, he joined Renaissance de Ngoumou.

In September 2014, Womé signed with Championnat National side FC Chambly.

In 2015, he joined French fourth-tier side US Roye-Noyon.

International career
Womé was a regular starter in the left back position for Cameroon during the late 1990s and early 2000s. He was a key member of the squads that won consecutive African Cup of Nations titles in 2000 and 2002 and the Olympic gold medal in 2000. All three tournaments were won on penalty shoot-outs, and Womé was a taker in all three victories. In the Olympic gold medal match, Womé scored the fifth and decisive penalty to win the title for his country. He also scored from the spot in the 2000 African Cup of Nations final, but his penalty in the following tournament was saved by Senegal's Tony Sylva. Womé also played as Cameroon's first choice left back in the 1998 and 2002 World Cups.

On 8 October 2005, Womé missed a 95th-minute penalty during Cameroon's final World Cup qualifier against Egypt that would have sent the Indomitable Lions to the 2006 FIFA World Cup; unfortunately for Womé he cannoned the shot off the outside of the post and Ivory Coast qualified at their expense.

During a press conference several days afterward, Womé said about the penalty: “No one wanted to take that penalty. No one. Neither Samuel Eto'o nor our captain Rigobert Song, because they knew what could have happened if they missed. I have always had the courage and I went to the spot.” He also claimed that some Cameroon fans wanted to kill him.

On 19 March 2007, Womé announced his retirement from international football. He later returned to the team in 2009 for a 2010 FIFA World Cup qualification match against Morocco.

Post-playing career
In March 2017, Womé was appointed sporting director of Canon Yaoundé by the club's president Emmannuel Mve.

Honours
Werder Bremen
DFL-Ligapokal: 2006

Cameroon
Africa Cup of Nations: 2000, 2002
Olympic Gold Medal: 2000

References

External links
 
 
 

1979 births
Living people
Footballers from Douala
Association football defenders
Cameroonian footballers
Canon Yaoundé players
L.R. Vicenza players
S.S.D. Lucchese 1905 players
A.S. Roma players
Bologna F.C. 1909 players
Serie A players
Serie B players
Fulham F.C. players
RCD Espanyol footballers
Brescia Calcio players
Inter Milan players
SV Werder Bremen players
1. FC Köln players
UMS de Loum players
Renaissance FC de Ngoumou players
US Roye-Noyon players
FC Chambly Oise players
Premier League players
La Liga players
Bundesliga players
Cameroonian expatriate footballers
Expatriate footballers in Italy
Expatriate footballers in Germany
Expatriate footballers in Spain
Expatriate footballers in England
Expatriate footballers in France
Olympic footballers of Cameroon
Olympic gold medalists for Cameroon
Footballers at the 2000 Summer Olympics
Cameroon under-20 international footballers
Cameroon international footballers
1996 African Cup of Nations players
1998 African Cup of Nations players
2000 African Cup of Nations players
2002 African Cup of Nations players
2006 Africa Cup of Nations players
1998 FIFA World Cup players
2001 FIFA Confederations Cup players
2002 FIFA World Cup players
Cameroonian expatriate sportspeople in Spain
Olympic medalists in football
Medalists at the 2000 Summer Olympics